Tweed is an unincorporated community in Laurens County, in the U.S. state of Georgia.

History
A post office called Tweed was established in 1880, and remained in operation until 1904. The community's name most likely is a transfer from the River Tweed, in Scotland.

References

Unincorporated communities in Georgia (U.S. state)
Unincorporated communities in Laurens County, Georgia